Voivodeship Road 101 (abbreviated DW 101) is a route in the Polish voivodeship roads network. It runs through the Pomeranian Voivodeship leading from Pierwoszyno from the Voivodeship road 100, and into Kosakowo where there is the new international airport.

Major cities and towns along the route 

Pierwoszyno
Kosakowo

Route plan

References

101